Football at the 1993 East Asian Games refers to a football tournament held during the East Asian Games. All matches were played in Shanghai, China PR in May 1993.

Final table

Results
Matchday 1

Matchday 2

Matchday 3

Matchday 4

Matchday 5

Medalists

References
1993 East Asian Games

1993
1993 in Asian football
football
1993
1993 in Chinese football
1993 in South Korean football
1993 in North Korean football
1993 in Japanese football